Abdoulaye Kanouté (born 14 May 1992) is a Malian professional footballer who plays as a forward for Gokulam Kerala B in the Kerala Premier League.

Club career
Born in Mali, Kanouté was included in the Lebanese sides Chabab Ghazieh SC and Bekaa in his initial years but he made his senior debut with Shabab Sahel, a Lebanese Premier League side in the 2016–17 season.

Aizawl
In November 2019, Kanouté moved to Indian club Aizawl for the upcoming I-League season.

On 6 December, Kanouté made his debut for the club in a 1–0 away loss, against NEROCA. He scored his first goal on 4 January, in a 1–1 stalemate against Gokulam Kerala. His sublime volley in the 14th-minute gave Aizawl the lead. On 11 February, he scored a brace off the bench to give Aizawl a 2–0 win over TRAU.

He scored four goals in nine matches during the league season which was stopped midway due to the COVID-19 pandemic in India.

Gokulam Kerala B
On 2022, Gokulam Kerala B roped in Kanouté for the upcoming Kerala Premier League season. On 18 February, he scored a header from a corner against AIFA in a 2–0 win.

References

1992 births
Living people
Malian footballers
Association football forwards
Lebanese Premier League players
Chabab Ghazieh SC players
Shabab Al Sahel FC players
Al Nabi Chit SC players
Aizawl FC players
I-League players
Malian expatriate footballers
Malian expatriate sportspeople in India
Malian expatriate sportspeople in Lebanon
Expatriate footballers in Lebanon
Expatriate footballers in India
21st-century Malian people